Sebastian Anthony Quirk (born 5 December 2001) is an English professional footballer who plays for Accrington Stanley, as a midfielder.

Career
Quirk began his career with Everton at the age of 11, turning professional in July 2020.

Quirk signed for Accrington Stanley in January 2023. He said he was "buzzing" to join the club. He made his debut on 21 January 2023.

Style of play
He has been compared to Kalvin Phillips.

References

2001 births
Living people
English footballers
Everton F.C. players
Accrington Stanley F.C. players
English Football League players
Association football midfielders